Kerrin Stokes (born 11 December 2002), is an Australian professional soccer player who plays as a central defender for Melbourne City.

Career statistics

Club

International

Notes

Honours
Melbourne City
 A-League Premiership: 2020–21
 A-League Championship: 2021

References

External links

2002 births
Living people
Australian soccer players
Soccer players from Adelaide
Association football defenders
Melbourne City FC players
Croydon Kings players
National Premier Leagues players
A-League Men players